Kasun may refer to:

Kasun (name)
Ali Kasun, a village in Syria
Kasun Eljabal, a village in Syria